The Brown Avenue Historic District is a rural historic district in Johnston, Rhode Island, USA.  The district encompasses a rural and agricultural landscape centered on a  stretch in the midsection of Brown Avenue, which runs between Hartford Avenue (United States Route 6) and Greenville Avenue (Rhode Island Route 5).  There are five farmsteads, with the Dame Farmstead at its center, whose farmhouses date to the late 18th century.  A number of these farms are no longer in production, and part of the district is in Snake Den State Park.

The district was added to the National Register of Historic Places in 1973.

See also
National Register of Historic Places listings in Providence County, Rhode Island

References

Historic districts in Providence County, Rhode Island
Johnston, Rhode Island
Historic districts on the National Register of Historic Places in Rhode Island
National Register of Historic Places in Providence County, Rhode Island